These are the statistics for the Euro 2008 in Austria and Switzerland.

Goalscorers

Awards
UEFA Team of the Tournament

Golden Boot
 David Villa (4 goals)

UEFA Player of the Tournament
 Xavi

Scoring
Total number of goals scored: 77
Average goals per match: 2.48
Top scorer: David Villa (4 goals)
Most goals scored by a team: 12 – Spain
Fewest goals scored by a team: 1 – Romania, Austria, Poland, Greece, France
Most goals conceded by a team: 9 – Turkey
Fewest goals conceded by a team: 2 – Croatia
First goal of the tournament: Václav Svěrkoš against Switzerland
Last goal of the tournament: Fernando Torres against Germany
Fastest goal in a match: 4 minutes: Luka Modrić against Austria 
Latest goal in a match with extra time: 120+2 minutes: Semih Şentürk against Croatia
Latest goal in a match without extra time: 90+3 minutes: Raul Meireles against Turkey
First hat-trick: David Villa against Russia
Most goals scored by one player in a match: 3 – David Villa against Russia
No own goals were scored during the tournament.

Attendance
Overall attendance: 1,140,902
Average attendance per match: 36,308

Wins and losses
Most wins: 5 – Spain
Fewest wins: 0 – Romania, Austria, Poland, France, Greece
Most losses: 3 – Greece
Fewest losses: 0 – Spain

Discipline
Sanctions against foul play at UEFA Euro 2008 are in the first instance the responsibility of the referee, but when he deems it necessary to give a caution, or dismiss a player, UEFA keeps a record and may enforce a suspension. Referee decisions are generally seen as final.  However, UEFA's disciplinary committee may additionally penalise players for offences unpunished by the referee.

Overview

Red cards
A player receiving a red card is automatically suspended for the next match.  A longer suspension is possible if the UEFA disciplinary committee judges the offence as warranting it. In keeping with the FIFA Disciplinary Code (FDC) and UEFA Disciplinary Regulations (UDR), UEFA does not allow for appeals of red cards except in the case of mistaken identity. The FDC further stipulates that if a player is sent off during his team's final Euro 2008 match, the suspension carries over to his team's next competitive international(s). For Euro 2008 these would be the qualification matches for the 2010 FIFA World Cup.

Any player who was suspended due to a red card that was earned in Euro 2008 qualifying is required to serve the balance of any suspension unserved by the end of qualifying either in the Euro 2008 finals (for any player on a team that qualified, whether he is selected to the final squad or not) or in World Cup qualifying (for players on teams that did not qualify).  This provision affected Russian captain Andrei Arshavin who missed his team's first two group matches after getting sent off in Russia's final Euro 2008 qualifier.

Yellow cards
Any player receiving a single yellow card during two of the three group stage matches plus the quarter-final match is suspended for the next match. A single yellow card does not carry over to the semi-finals. This means that no player will be suspended for final unless he gets sent off in semi-final or he is serving a longer suspension for an earlier incident. Suspensions due to yellow cards will not carry over to the World Cup qualifiers. Yellow cards and any related suspensions earned in the Euro 2008 qualifiers are neither counted nor enforced in the final tournament.

In the event a player is sent off for two bookable offences, only the red card is counted for disciplinary purposes.  However, in the event a player receives a direct red card after being booked in the same match, then both cards are counted.  If the player was already facing a suspension for two tournament bookings when he was sent off, this would result in separate suspensions that would be served consecutively.  The one match ban for the yellow cards would be served first unless the player's team is eliminated in the match in which he was sent off.  If the player's team is eliminated in the match in which he was serving his ban for the yellow cards, then the ban for the sending off would be carried over to the World Cup qualifiers.

Additional punishment
For serious transgressions, a longer suspension may be handed down at the discretion of the UEFA disciplinary committee. The disciplinary committee is also charged with reviewing any incidents that were missed by the officials and can award administrative red cards and suspensions accordingly. However, just as appeals of red cards are not considered, the disciplinary committee is also not allowed to review transgressions that were already punished by the referee with something less than a red card. For example, if a player is booked but not sent off for a dangerous tackle, the disciplinary committee cannot subsequently deem the challenge to be violent conduct and then upgrade the card to a red. However, if the same player then spits at the opponent but is still not sent off, then the referee's report would be unlikely to mention this automatic red card offence. Video evidence of the spitting incident could then be independently reviewed.

Unlike the rules in many domestic competitions, there is no particular category of red card offence that automatically results in a multi-game suspension. In general however, extended bans are only assessed for red cards given for serious foul play, violent conduct, spitting or perhaps foul and abusive language. Also, unlike many sets of domestic rules second and subsequent red cards also do not automatically incur an extended ban, although a player's past disciplinary record (including prior competition) might be considered by the disciplinary committee when punishing him. As a rule, only automatic red card offenses are considered for longer bans. A player who gets sent off for picking up two yellow cards in the same match will not have his automatic one-match ban extended by UEFA on account of what he did to get the second booking, because the referee has deemed him as not to have committed an automatic red card offense.

If UEFA suspends a player after his team's elimination from the tournament, or for more games than the team ends up playing without him prior to the final or their elimination (whichever comes first), then the remaining suspension must be served during World Cup qualifying. For a particularly grave offence UEFA has the power to impose a lengthy ban against the offender.

Disciplinary statistics
Total number of yellow cards: 121
Average number of yellow cards: 3.90
Total number of red cards: 3
Average number of red cards: 0.097
First yellow card: Ludovic Magnin - Switzerland against Czech Republic
First red card: Bastian Schweinsteiger - Germany against Croatia
Fastest yellow card from kickoff: 1 minute - Angelos Charisteas - Greece against Sweden
Fastest yellow card after coming on as a substitute: 1 minute - Johan Vonlanthen - Switzerland against Czech Republic
Latest yellow card in a match without extra time: 90+5 minutes - Milan Baroš - Czech Republic against Turkey
Fastest dismissal from kickoff: 24 minutes - Eric Abidal - France against Italy
Latest dismissal in a match without extra time: 90+2 minutes - Bastian Schweinsteiger - Germany against Croatia, Volkan Demirel - Turkey against Czech Republic
Latest dismissal in a match with extra time: No dismissals were made in extra time.
Least time difference between two yellow cards given to the same player: No player was sent off for receiving a second yellow card in a match.
Most yellow cards (team): 15 - Turkey
Most red cards (team): 1 - Turkey, France, Germany
Fewest yellow cards (team): 3 - Sweden
Most yellow cards (player): 2 - 18 different players
Most red cards (player): 1 (3 players) - Bastian Schweinsteiger, Eric Abidal, Volkan Demirel
Most yellow cards (match): 8 - Switzerland vs. Portugal
Most red cards (match): 1 (3 matches) - Croatia vs. Germany, Turkey vs. Czech Republic, France vs. Italy
Fewest yellow cards (match): 0 - Spain vs. Russia
Most cards in one match: 8 yellow cards and 7 yellow cards + 1 red card (2 matches) - Switzerland vs. Portugal, Turkey vs. Czech Republic, France vs. Italy

By individual

Red cards
Three red cards were shown over the course of the tournament's 31 matches, an average of 0.097 red cards per match.

1 red card
  Eric Abidal
  Bastian Schweinsteiger
  Volkan Demirel

Yellow cards
121 yellow cards were shown over the course of the tournament's 31 matches, an average of 3.90 yellow cards per match

2 yellow cards
  Sebastian Prödl
  Michael Ballack
  Giorgos Karagounis
  Gennaro Gattuso
  Andrea Pirlo
  Mariusz Lewandowski
  Cristian Chivu
  Dorin Goian
  Denis Kolodin
  Dmitri Torbinski
  Yuri Zhirkov
  Tranquillo Barnetta
  Johan Vonlanthen
  Emre Aşık
  Mehmet Aurélio
  Tuncay
  Sabri Sarıoğlu
  Arda Turan

1 yellow card
  Erwin Hoffer
  Andreas Ivanschitz
  Ümit Korkmaz
  Emanuel Pogatetz
  Jürgen Säumel
  Martin Stranzl
  Robert Kovač
  Jerko Leko
  Luka Modrić
  Josip Šimunić
  Darijo Srna
  Hrvoje Vejić
  Ognjen Vukojević
  Milan Baroš
  Tomáš Galásek
  Jan Polák

1 yellow card (cont.)
  Tomáš Ujfaluši
  Jean-Alain Boumsong
  Patrice Evra
  Sidney Govou
  Thierry Henry
  Claude Makélélé
  Willy Sagnol
  Jérémy Toulalan
  Arne Friedrich
  Kevin Kurányi
  Philipp Lahm
  Jens Lehmann
  Bastian Schweinsteiger
  Angelos Basinas
  Angelos Charisteas
  Nikos Liberopoulos
  Giourkas Seitaridis
  Vasilis Torosidis
  Loukas Vyntra
  Massimo Ambrosini
  Daniele De Rossi
  Luca Toni
  Gianluca Zambrotta
  Khalid Boulahrouz
  Nigel de Jong
  André Ooijer
  Rafael van der Vaart
  Robin van Persie
  Jacek Bąk
  Jacek Krzynówek
  Euzebiusz Smolarek
  Marcin Wasilewski
  Tomasz Zahorski
  José Bosingwa
  Paulo Ferreira

1 yellow card (cont.)
  Fernando Meira
  Miguel
  Pepe
  Petit
  Hélder Postiga
  Jorge Ribeiro
  Cosmin Contra
  Adrian Mutu
  Daniel Niculae
  Andrei Arshavin
  Diniyar Bilyaletdinov
  Sergei Semak
  Ivan Saenko
  Álvaro Arbeloa
  Iker Casillas
  Santi Cazorla
  Dani Güiza
  Andrés Iniesta
  Carlos Marchena
  Fernando Torres
  David Villa
  Johan Elmander
  Andreas Isaksson
  Anders Svensson
  Eren Derdiyok
  Gelson Fernandes
  Ludovic Magnin
  Hakan Yakin
  Hakan Balta
  Uğur Boral
  Colin Kazim-Richards
  Semih Şentürk
  Mehmet Topal
  Gökhan Zan

By referee

By team
Last updated after Russia-Spain on 26 June 2008.

Clean sheets
Most clean sheets: 3 – Spain
Fewest clean sheets: 0 – Turkey, Austria, Poland, Greece

Penalty kicks
Not counting penalty shoot-outs, there were five penalty kicks awarded during the tournament. For the first time since tournament expansion for Euro 1996, no penalties were awarded during the knockout phase. Romanian Adrian Mutu provided the sole penalty miss, late in the match against world champions Italy; had he scored and Romania held on for the win, the Italians would have been knocked out.

Scored
Luka Modrić for  v 
Ivica Vastić for  v 
Andrea Pirlo for  v 
Hakan Yakin for  v 

Missed
Adrian Mutu for  v , saved by Gianluigi Buffon

Overall statistics
In the following tables:
 Pld = total games played
 W = total games won
 D = total games drawn (tied)
 L = total games lost
 Pts = total points accumulated (teams receive three points for a win, one point for a draw and no points for a loss)
 APts = average points per game
 GF = total goals scored (goals for)
 AGF = average goals scored per game
 GA = total goals conceded (goals against)
 AGA = average goals conceded per game
 GD = goal difference (GF−GA)
 CS = clean sheets
 ACS = average clean sheets
 YC = yellow cards
 AYC = average yellow cards
 RC = red cards
 ARC = average red cards

Italics indicates that the nation is a host nation
BOLD indicates that this nation has the highest

Matches decided by penalty-kicks in the knockout phase are considered as Draw.

Notes

References 

Statistics
2008